168 Sibylla is a large main-belt asteroid, discovered by Canadian-American astronomer J. C. Watson on September 28, 1876. It was most likely named for the Sibyls, referring to the Ancient Greek female oracles. Based upon its spectrum this object is classified as a C-type asteroid, which indicates it is very dark and composed of primitive carbonaceous materials. 168 Sibylla is a Cybele asteroid, orbiting beyond most of the main-belt asteroids.

Photometric observations of this asteroid made at the Torino Observatory in Italy during 1990–1991 were used to determine a synodic rotation period of 23.82 ± 0.004 hours. The shape of this slowly rotating object appears to resemble an oblate spheroid.

References

External links
 
 

Cybele asteroids
Sibylla
Sibylla
C-type asteroids (Tholen)
Ch-type asteroids (SMASS)
18760928